Emirati Americans are Americans who have roots, origin and descent from the United Arab Emirates.

Demographics
There are over 2,000 Emiratis in the US, the vast majority of whom are students pursuing education across various universities and institutes. According to a report produced by the Institute of International Education, there were more than 1,200 Emiratis living and studying at US universities during the 2008–09 academic year. This was a 24 percent jump from the previous year and reflected the growing trend of Emirati students choosing the U.S. as a base for higher education. 

Out of those figures, 60 percent were undergraduate students, 17 percent were graduate and 21 percent were studying at a non-degree (English language and other short-term training or non-degree programme) level. A further 2 per cent were proceeding with optional practical training after the conclusion of their academic courses. The UAE government has implemented a wide range of services to Emirati nationals in the US, often in the form of financial support and funding. It is estimated that there is a very small diaspora, mainly because the UAE provides them with more than adequate welfare benefits, removing the need to live and work in other developed countries. Some long-settled Emiratis in the US have acquired American citizenship over the years.

The US remains one of the most popular destinations for Emirati students. As of the 2012/13 academic year, there were over 2,250 UAE students studying in the US.

Notable people
 Ali Alexander
 Yasmine Al-Bustami

See also

 Arab Americans
 Emirati diaspora
 Americans in the United Arab Emirates
 United Arab Emirates–United States relations

Sources

External links
 Characteristics of the Asian Born in the United States: Migration Information Source
 Emirati in New York: The National (Abu Dhabi)

 
 
Arab American
American
Middle Eastern American